Naughty but Nice is the fourth studio album by German singer Sarah Connor. It was released by X-Cell and Epic Records on 21 March 2005 in German-speaking Europe. As with her previous projects, Connor consulted production and songwriting duo Rob Tyger and Kay Denar to work with her on the album, with frequent collaborator Bülent Aris also returning following his absence on Key to My Soul (2003). In addition, Johnny Douglas, Terri Bjerre, Emily Friendship, and Ivo Moring scored songwriting credits.

A major success, the album became Connor's first album to reach the top of the German Albums Chart, while peaking at number three in both Austria and Switzerland. It was eventually certified platinum by the Bundesverband Musikindustrie (BVMI) and reached gold status in Austria and Switzerland, making it her biggest-selling album since her debut.

Naughty but Nice was the 16th Best-selling album in 2005. The album spawned two singles only: Connor's third consecutive number-one hit "Living to Love You", and "From Zero to Hero", the soundtrack to 20th Century Fox' computer-animated film Robots. The album cut "I Just Started Being Bad" was used as the theme song for Connor's reality show Sarah and Marc in Love (2005).

Critical reception 

AllMusic rated the album three out of five stars.

Track listing

Charts

Weekly charts

Year-end charts

Certifications and sales

References

External links
 SarahConnor.com — official site

Sarah Connor (singer) albums
2005 albums